The Global Innovation through Science and Technology initiative (GIST) is a U.S. government program on innovation and entrepreneurship. The program assists businesspeople in establishing startups. GIST participants in 135 emerging economies can develop skills, build networks, find mentors, and access financing through a combination of in-country training, a pitch competition, interactive online programming, and direct connections to U.S. experts. GIST helps create conditions for successful local entrepreneurship ecosystems and enables global youth to develop local solutions to local problems. GIST is also one of the key programs under President Obama's SPARK Initiative, an initiative under which programs are selected to represent the best work being done by the U.S. Government to advance entrepreneurship around the world.

Since 2011, GIST has engaged more than 2.8 million innovators and entrepreneurs worldwide and mentored over 5,000 startups that have generated more than $110 million in revenue. GIST is a partnership led by the U.S. Department of State's Bureau of Oceans and International Environmental and Scientific Affairs, with the implementation of programs by Venturewell and the American Association for the Advancement of Science (AAAS).

Launch 
The GIST programs were announced at the 2011 conference on Economic Development through Science and Technology Innovation in Rabat, Morocco attended by U.S. Assistant Secretary of State for Oceans and International Environmental and Scientific Affairs Dr. Kerri-Ann Jones. This conference was the third and final consultative meeting to develop high-impact engagement opportunities. Previous meetings were held in Alexandria, Egypt and Kuala Lumpur, Malaysia.  The GIST initiative exemplifies a science and technology innovation partnership that U.S. President Barack Obama called for in a 2009 speech at Cairo University.

GIST assists entrepreneurs in 135 emerging economies through its Global Online Innovation Community, including online programming and mentorship; in-country training programs, the GIST Startup Boot Camps, GIST Ideation Boot Camps and GIST Villages; and the annual GIST Tech-I Global Pitch Competition.

Global Online Innovation Community

GISTNetwork is a government program led by the Department of State that provides a user-driven online resource to help young science and technology entrepreneurs in emerging economies build viable startups. GISTNetwork connects entrepreneurs to peers, mentors, experts, and financing both globally and within their communities.

GISTNetwork's online community provides:  Mentors from top U.S. universities, Silicon Valley startups and local communities around the world; live and on-demand programming, including pages focused on specific local communities; and access to international angel investors and venture capitalists and a meeting place to find entrepreneurial team members.

GIST Online Programming

GIST online programming provides in-country entrepreneurs with direct online access to U.S. businesspeople and academics. The two key online programs are the GIST TechConnect and GIST Guru Series.

GIST In-Country Training Programs 
GIST in-country programs nurture the next generation of innovators and entrepreneurs through direct, on-the-ground training.  Top U.S. and in-country leaders teach and mentor aspiring entrepreneurs, who also develop financial know-how and access to capital that allow them  to advance their science and technology ventures with skill and confidence. There are three main in-country programs: GIST Ideation Boot Camps; GIST Startup Boot Camps; and GIST Villages.

GIST Tech-I Global Pitch Competition

The GIST Tech-I Global Pitch Competition is an annual competition for science and technology entrepreneurs from emerging economies worldwide. Participants produce videos to pitch their ideas and startups, which are reviewed first by a panel of experts and then by the online voting public. Finalists receive a trip to the Global Entrepreneurship Summit (GES), three months of one-to-one mentoring, and the chance to win seed capital.  Through two days of intensive training and pitching their ventures at the GES, GIST Tech-I finalists make connections and gain international exposure.

Since 2011, innovators from over 100 emerging economies have showcased their science and technology ventures through GIST Tech-I Global Pitch Competitions, with over one million votes from the online voting public.

The first Tech-I competition occurred in 2011 in Istanbul, Turkey. Notable Tech-I finalists have included Nermin Sa'd, founder of Hanadisayat.net from Jordan; and Natali Ardianto, founder and CTO of Tiket.com from Indonesia.

The Tech-I Competition of the GIST initiative is implemented by the American Association for the Advancement of Science (AAAS).

References

External links
 

Entrepreneurship organizations
Types of diplomacy
Innovation organizations